Georgina Parker (born 16 December 1964) is an Australian television soap actress and has also appeared in film and theatre. She is a double Gold Logie winner, best known for her acting roles in Australian soap operas; as Lucy Gardiner (later Tyler) in A Country Practice; as Theresa "Terri" Sullivan in All Saints; and as Roo Stewart in Home and Away.

Personal life
Parker was born in 1964. She grew up in the Sydney North Shore suburb of St Ives and attended St Ives North Public School in primary and attended  Abbotsleigh School for Girls, in Sydney. Parker is the daughter of iconic Australian furniture designer Tony Parker of Parker Furniture. She has been married since December 1999 to Steve Worland, the screenwriter of the Fox Searchlight feature film Bootmen (2000). Worland is also an action-adventure novelist and wrote Velocity (2012) and Combustion (2013). They have a daughter, Holly, born in September 2000. Parker suffers from Scoliosis and is an ambassador of the National Scoliosis Foundation

Career
Parker was first seen in a small cameo part in the Yahoo Serious movie Young Einstein, before becoming a fixture on Australian television through her role as nurse Lucy Gardiner in A Country Practice from 1989 to 1992. She also appeared as Despina, Memo's love interest, in the sitcom Acropolis Now. She had starring roles in the television series Over the Hill in 1994 and as young firefighter "Mad Dog" Cartwright in the first season of Fire in 1995.

From 1998 until 2005, Parker played Sister Teresa (Terri) Sullivan, a nurse and former nun, in the Australian medical drama series All Saints, for which she was awarded a number of Logies, including 'Most Popular Actress' in 2001. This saw her win the award for the fourth time, having already won 3 times from 1991 to 1993 for her role on A Country Practice. In 2001 & 2002 Parker won the Gold Logie or 'Most Popular TV Personality' firmly cementing her place as an Australian television favourite.

In 2002, Parker took part in the Australian musical theatre production The Man from Snowy River: Arena Spectacular, where she appeared as "Kate Conroy", the daughter of the Station owner, "John Conroy" – and the romantic interest of "Jim Ryan" (The Man).

In 2004 Parker starred in the Sydney Theatre Company's production of Scenes From A Separation, as journalist Nina Molyneux. After concluding her work on All Saints in 2005, Parker starred in the Ensemble Theatre's production of 'Chapter Two' as actress Jennie MacLaine.

In 2006, she joined the Nine Network to host the new TV show, Clever. She also appears on the ABC children's show Play School and starred in the telemovie 'Stepfather of the Bride' for the same network. In 2006 she also headlined the Network Ten tele-movie The Society Murders. She was a semi-regular guest on the show The Glass House.

She was in The Wiggles DVD Racing to the Rainbow.

Georgie Parker starred in the drama Emerald Falls, which aired on Network Ten. She also briefly hosted Animal Emergency for Channel Nine in 2008, and acted as the New South Wales Premier in the telemovie Scorched for Channel Nine in 2008. .

Parker released a children's album in 2008.

2010s
In 2010, she appeared as Det. Senior Sergeant Susan Blake on the Australian drama City Homicide. She plays Miss Monica in David Williamson's Rhinestone Rex and Miss Monica.

The Seven Network announced in August 2010 that Parker would return to screens playing the character of Roo Stewart in Home and Away. The character was previously portrayed by Justine Clarke from 1988 to 1989.

In 2011, Parker appeared on Who Do You Think You Are? Season 3, Episode 6, in which she explored the strength and courage shown by the women on both sides of her family. On her mother's side, Georgie's quest begins with her maternal grandmother Grace, before investigating her father's maternal ancestors, the Breckenridges.

Filmography

Awards and nominations
Parker has been nominated for Logie Awards several times, and has won many Logies, including two Gold Logies.

Awards for Georgie Parker include:

Other

References

External links
 
 Georgie Parker at the AuSoaps website

Australian television actresses
Australian musical theatre actresses
Australian film actresses
Gold Logie winners
Actresses from Sydney
1964 births
Living people
Australian people with disabilities
Australian children's television presenters
People educated at Abbotsleigh
Australian women television presenters